In geometry, the square antiprism is the second in an infinite family of antiprisms formed by an even-numbered sequence of triangle sides closed by two polygon caps. It is also known as an anticube.

If all its faces are regular, it is a semiregular polyhedron or uniform polyhedron.

A nonuniform D4-symmetric variant is the cell of the noble square antiprismatic 72-cell.

Points on a sphere
When eight points are distributed on the surface of a sphere with the aim of maximising the distance between them in some sense, the resulting shape corresponds to a square antiprism rather than a cube. Specific methods of distributing the points include, for example, the Thomson problem (minimizing the sum of all the reciprocals of distances between points), maximising the distance of each point to the nearest point, or minimising the sum of all reciprocals of squares of distances between points.

Molecules with square antiprismatic geometry

According to the VSEPR theory of molecular geometry in chemistry, which is based on the general principle of maximizing the distances between points, a square antiprism is the favoured geometry when eight pairs of electrons surround a central atom. One molecule with this geometry is the octafluoroxenate(VI) ion in the salt nitrosonium octafluoroxenate(VI); however, the molecule is distorted away from the idealized square antiprism. Very few ions are cubical because such a shape would cause large repulsion between ligands;  is one of the few examples.

In addition, the element sulfur forms octatomic S8 molecules as its most stable allotrope. The S8 molecule has a structure based on the square antiprism, in which the eight atoms occupy the eight vertices of the antiprism, and the eight triangle-triangle edges of the antiprism correspond to single covalent bonds between sulfur atoms.

In architecture 
The main building block of the One World Trade Center (at the site of the old World Trade Center destroyed on September 11, 2001) has the shape of an extremely tall tapering square antiprism. It is not a true antiprism because of its taper: the top square has half the area of the bottom one.

Topologically identical polyhedra

Twisted prism
A twisted prism can be made (clockwise or counterclockwise) with the same vertex arrangement. It can be seen as the convex form with 4 tetrahedrons excavated around the sides. However, after this it can no longer be triangulated into tetrahedra without adding new vertices. It has half of the symmetry of the uniform solution: D4 order 4.

Crossed antiprism
A crossed square antiprism is a star polyhedron, topologically identical to the square antiprism with the same vertex arrangement, but it can't be made uniform; the sides are isosceles triangles. Its vertex configuration is 3.3/2.3.4, with one triangle retrograde.  It has d4d symmetry, order 8.

Related polyhedra

Derived polyhedra
The gyroelongated square pyramid is a Johnson solid (specifically, J10) constructed by augmenting one a square pyramid. Similarly, the gyroelongated square bipyramid (J17) is a deltahedron (a polyhedron whose faces are all equilateral triangles) constructed by replacing both squares of a square antiprism with a square pyramid.

The snub disphenoid (J84) is another deltahedron, constructed by replacing the two squares of a square antiprism by pairs of equilateral triangles. The snub square antiprism (J85) can be seen as a square antiprism with a chain of equilateral triangles inserted around the middle. The sphenocorona (J86) and the sphenomegacorona (J88) are other Johnson solids that, like the square antiprism, consist of two squares and an even number of equilateral triangles.

The square antiprism can be truncated and alternated to form a snub antiprism:

Symmetry mutation
As an antiprism, the square antiprism belongs to a family of polyhedra that includes the octahedron (which can be seen as a triangle-capped antiprism), the pentagonal antiprism, the hexagonal antiprism, and the octagonal antiprism.

The square antiprism is first in a series of snub polyhedra and tilings with vertex figure 3.3.4.3.n.

Examples

See also 
 Biscornu

Notes

External links 
 
 Square Antiprism interactive model
 Virtual Reality Polyhedra www.georgehart.com: The Encyclopedia of Polyhedra
 VRML model
 polyhedronisme A4

Prismatoid polyhedra
Snub tilings